Abdulrahman Al-Dakheel (born 26 May 1996) is a Saudi Arabian professional footballer who plays as a centre-back for Pro League side Al-Hazem.

Career
Al-Dakheel started out his career at hometown club Al-Arabi where he spent two seasons. On 21 July 2017, Al-Dakheel joined Al-Hazem. He spent two seasons at the club without making an appearance before being loaned out to Al-Taqadom for the 2019–20 season. He returned to the club following the end of his loan and made his debut for Al-Hazem on 20 October 2020 against Arar. He made 33 appearances and scored once as Al-Hazem were crowned champions of the MS League.

Honours
Al-Hazem
MS League: 2020–21

References

External links
 
 

Living people
1996 births
People from Unaizah
Association football defenders
Saudi Arabian footballers
Saudi Arabia youth international footballers
Al-Arabi SC (Saudi Arabia) players
Al-Hazem F.C. players
Al-Taqadom FC players
Saudi Fourth Division players
Saudi First Division League players
Saudi Professional League players